The Chungbuk Line(충북선, 忠北線) is a railway line serving North Chungcheong Province in South Korea.  The line connects Jochiwon on the Gyeongbu Line to Bongyang on the Jungang Line, serving the major cities of Cheongju and Chungju en route. Cheongju International Airport is located near the rail line.

History

Prewar 
The first section of the line was opened by the privately owned Chōsen Central Railway in 1921, which became part of the Chōsen Railway (Chōtetsu) in 1923. Chōtetsu then continued to extend the line until 1928 to Chungju as follows:

Plans existed to continue the line from Chungju to Yeongwol, but after the end of Japanese rule this plan was abandoned until 1949, after which the extension was built as the Korean National Railroad's Taebaek Line.

In the November 1942 timetable, the last issued prior to the start of the Pacific War, Chōtetsu operated the following schedule of local passenger services ("R" indicates that train was operated by railcar):

Postwar 
Like the other private railways this line was also nationalized after the independence of Korea. The rest section of the line was opened on January 10, 1959.

Upgrade

Until the 1980s the section Osong–Baongyang (110.6 km) was reconstructed with the double track and the part of the railway was moved. The entire line was electrified on 30 March 2005.

On September 1, 2010, the South Korean government announced a strategic plan to reduce travel times from Seoul to 95% of the country to under 2 hours by 2020. As part of the plan, the Chungbuk Line is to be upgraded for 230 km/h and may see KTX service. 

The movie Peppermint Candy was shot near Gongjeon station.

Route

Original route

See also
Korail

References

 Japanese Government Railways, (1937), 鉄道停車場一覧. 昭和12年10月1日現在(The List of the Stations as of 1 October 1937), Kawaguchi Printing Company, Tokyo, p 507

Railway lines in South Korea
Airport rail links
Railway lines opened in 1921
Chosen Railway